Hurricane Bonnie was a strong tropical cyclone that survived the crossover from the Atlantic Ocean to the Pacific Ocean, the first to do so since Hurricane Otto in 2016. The second named storm of the 2022 Atlantic hurricane season, it originated from a strong tropical wave that moved off the west coast of Africa on June 23. Moving with little development despite favorable conditions, the National Hurricane Center (NHC) started advisories on it as Potential Tropical Cyclone Two late on June 27, due to its imminent threat to land. It later became the fourth named storm, third hurricane, and first major hurricane of the 2022 Pacific hurricane season after crossing Nicaragua and Costa Rica from east to west on July 2 and intensifying to a Category 3 hurricane on July 5. Bonnie rapidly weakened, dissipating over the North Pacific.

Bonnie was the first of two tropical cyclones in 2022 to cross from the Atlantic to the Pacific, the second being Hurricane Julia. At least 3,572 individuals were evacuated in Costa Rica. Heavy rains led to flooding and numerous mudslides, with 40 homes flooded in Trinidad and Tobago. A total of 5 people were killed, and damage was estimated at $25 million.

Meteorological history

Hurricane Bonnie's origins can be traced to a tropical wave that emerged off the west coast of Africa on June 23, tracked by the NHC. By June 25, the wave had become better defined: its limited shower and thunderstorm activity increased as it moved to the west-northwest toward the southernmost Windward Islands. Due to the threat the disturbance posed to the Windward Islands, it was designated as Potential Tropical Cyclone Two at 21:00 UTC on June 27. Around this time, NOAA Hurricane Hunters reconnaissance aircraft found an area of tropical storm-force winds, despite not finding a closed circulation.

As the system approached the Windward Islands, the mid-level circulation was displaced and convection was disoriented onto an east–west line. As it crossed the Windward Islands on the morning of June 29, the disturbance appeared like a tropical cyclone on conventional satellite data, displaying large bursts of convection near the center and prominent rainbands, speeding westward at 23 knots (26 mph; 43 km/h). However, observations from microwave data still displayed the wave as lacking a well-defined center or low-level structure. The disturbance then moved along the ABC Islands and northern coast of South America, producing heavy rainfall throughout the region from spiral rainbands.

It then crossed the Guajira Peninsula of South America around 09:00 UTC on June 30. During and after this, the mid-levels of the disturbance became better defined, deep convection associated with the system persisted, and Air Force Hurricane Hunter reconnaissance data confirmed that the circulation had become well-defined. Hence, the disturbance became a tropical storm, receiving the name Bonnie on July 1 at 13:15 UTC. According to satellite imagery, the storm became better organized with deeper convection at the center. At 03:00 UTC on July 2, Bonnie made landfall just south of the Costa Rican border with Nicaragua. At the time, it had sustained winds of 50 mph (85 km/h). Following landfall, Bonnie moved through Central America, with the coldest clouds over the center.

At 15:00 UTC on July 2, Bonnie crossed over into the Pacific basin, becoming the first to survive the crossover from the Atlantic to the Pacific since Hurricane Otto in 2016. The well-defined center of circulation and banding persisted in the storm several hours later. Microwave imaging indicated that an inner core developed. Bonnie continued to organize, with satellite images showing a strong convective band on the western portions of the storm. Bonnie strengthened into a Category 1 hurricane on the Saffir–Simpson scale by July 4 just south of Salina Cruz, Oaxaca, making it the third hurricane of the Pacific hurricane season. Nine hours later, the ragged eye of the cyclone developed that was visible on satellite imagery. Later that day, Bonnie intensified into a Category 2 system as an inner core and distinct eye became apparent and upper-level outflow became fairly well-defined.

Shortly afterward, Bonnie's cloud pattern deteriorated and its eye started to become less defined, causing the cyclone to weaken to a Category 2 strength by 03:00 UTC on July 6. Bonnie began to rapidly weaken due to wind shear and cooler waters. As a result, the hurricane weakened to Category 1 strength as it passed south of Clarion Island on July 7. The circulation center became embedded with a small central dense overcast to the north early on July 8, marking Bonnie's degradation to a tropical storm. At 21:00 UTC on July 9, Bonnie degenerated into a post-tropical cyclone. The remnant low moved westward and dissipated in the northern Pacific on July 11.

Preparations and impacts
Upon designation as a potential tropical cyclone late on June 27, a Tropical Storm Warning was posted for Trinidad and Tobago and Grenada. These warnings were cancelled by 09:00 UTC on June 29.

Trinidad and Tobago 
An orange level tropical storm warning was issued by the national meteorological office. Schools were closed on June 28 for non-CAPE students and were to resume the next day. Several domestic flights to and from the United States, Barbados, Guyana, Jamaica, Suriname, St. Maarten, and Curaçao by carrier Caribbean Airlines were cancelled or delayed. The government of Trinidad and Tobago considered allowing public sector employees to work remotely under weather alerts. Government buildings closed at noon on June 28, but several private businesses closed earlier. Ferry services to Tobago were called off and the last ferry to leave for San Fernando departed from Port of Spain on the afternoon of June 28. A total of 387 shelters were prepared for the storm, 712 municipal officers were deployed to ensure safety of vehicles parked at these facilities.

Trinidad and Tobago was left with mostly minimal damage from the potential tropical cyclone, with some areas receiving heavy rainfall and flash flooding. On the island of Tobago, emergency agencies received two reports of roof damage, four of downed trees, one of a vehicle accident, and a collapsed home. A 79-year-old woman who was inside the wooden home which collapsed on the morning of June 29 escaped unharmed but lost all belongings in her home which she had owned for over 20 years. Nesting sites of leatherback turtles at beaches in Grande Riviere were severely impacted by floodwaters, washing away thousands of eggs. At least 40 homes in the village were flooded; flooding up to 6 feet (1.82 m) deep scattered organic debris across the beach. Several mudslides and rockfalls occurred along a road linking the villages of 
Monte Video and Matelot. More than 200,000 customers nationwide lost access to drinking water, which affected 26 communities and several water treatment facilities.

Mexico 
Hurricane Bonnie, as a Category 3 system, prompted Mexican authorities to issue warnings of heavy rainfall to the states of Colima, Guerrero, Jalisco, and Michoacán as it advanced inland. Authorities in Mexico warned of heavy rainfall in several states, and warned of waves of up to 3 to 5 meters in the coasts of the states of Oaxaca and Guerrero. Bonnie weakened to a Category 1 hurricane and was expected to become a tropical storm after going north, off the coasts of Cabo San Lucas, in the state of Baja California Sur.

Elsewhere 
In Costa Rica, 3,572 people had been evacuated in different parts of the country to shelters, after registering flooding and landslides. Furthermore, 15 cantons were under a red alert, and 8,593 homes were left without power. 

In Grenada, electricity providers warned citizens to prepare for power outages and to not touch downed power lines. 

In Chiriquí Province, Panama, several families were evacuated due to landslides and heavy rainfall.

In Colombia, the government warned the Island of San Andrés, while in neighboring Venezuela, classes and flights were suspended. Meanwhile, the governments of Nicaragua and Honduras issued alerts to their whole territories for the storm. In Nicaragua, authorities reported four deaths in relation to the storm. Bonnie was also responsible for one death in El Salvador as it emerged into the Pacific Basin.

See also

Weather of 2022
Tropical cyclones in 2022
Other storms of the same name
List of Category 3 Pacific hurricanes
List of Atlantic–Pacific crossover hurricanes
Hurricane Irene–Olivia (1971) – a crossover storm with a similar track
Hurricane Joan–Miriam (1988) – a crossover hurricane which caused severe damage in Central America
Tropical Storm Bret (1993) – a storm with a near-identical track and intensity in the Atlantic
Hurricane Cesar–Douglas (1996) – a storm with a similar track and intensity
Hurricane Julia (2022) - An Atlantic hurricane that crossed over nearly 3 months after Bonnie

References

External links

 The National Hurricane Center's advisory archive on Tropical Storm Bonnie (Atlantic Basin) 
 The National Hurricane Center's advisory archive on Hurricane Bonnie (Eastern Pacific Basin)

2022 Atlantic hurricane season
2022 Pacific hurricane season
Tropical cyclones in 2022
2022 meteorology
Atlantic tropical storms
Category 3 Pacific hurricanes
Hurricanes in Nicaragua
Hurricanes in Costa Rica
Cape Verde hurricanes